The Electronic Music Awards & Foundation was an awards and charity event announced on January 28, 2016 by Paul Oakenfold and TV4 Entertainment, which is headed by executive producer Paul Duddridge and CEO Jon Cody.  Russell Thomas served as the director of the program. The EMAF has no affiliation with The Electronic Music Awards and is not an extension of EMAF.

History
The event, originally called the "Electronic Music Awards & Foundation Show," was formed by Oakenfold, Duddridge, and Cody to give the Dance and EDM community an awards show of their own as well as giving back to the global community with the proceeds going to charities. It was to take place at the SLS Hotel in Los Angeles, California on April 14, 2016, and to air on Fox as a one-hour special on April 23, 2016. This would've mark the first time that a major awards show devoted to the Dance/EDM community aired on American television.

On April 12, 2016, the event was being postponed. In a statement from the organizers "As this is the first year of the awards, we have the luxury of flexibility, which we are taking advantage of to decide the optimal timetable to present the awards. With this opportunity, we felt that it would better to represent the electronic music calendar in the fall rather than the spring."

Nomination List
On February 18, 2016, seven categories were announced, with Calvin Harris, Kygo, DJ Snake, and Galantis are tied with two nominations apiece; With the 2017 announcement, there'll be eleven categories.

2016 (announced at the time)

Single of the Year
Calvin Harris & Disciples - "How Deep Is Your Love"
The Chainsmokers featuring ROZES - "Roses"
Galantis - "Runaway (U & I)"
Kygo featuring Parson James - "Stole the Show"
Major Lazer & DJ Snake featuring MØ - "Lean On"

Album of the Year 
Alina Baraz & Galimatias - Urban Flora
Calvin Harris - Motion
Disclosure - Caracal
Galantis - Pharmacy
Jamie xx - In Colour

Radio Show of the Year
BBC Radio 1 Essential Mix 
BPM with Geronimo – Sirius XM
Danny Howard – BBC Radio 1’s Dance Anthems
Diplo and Friends - BBC Radio 1Xtra
Jason Bentley – Morning Becomes Eclectic – KCRW

Festival of the Year
Creamfields - Daresbury, England
Electric Daisy Carnival - Las Vegas, Nevada, USA
Sónar - Barcelona, Spain
The BPM Festival - Playa del Carmen, Mexico
Ultra Music Festival - Miami, Florida, USA

DJ of the Year
Carl Cox
Diplo
Dixon
DJ Harvey
Skrillex

Best New Artist
Bob Moses
DJ Snake
Jauz
KSHMR
Kygo

Best Club of the Year
Amnesia
Fabric
Omnia
Sound LA
Zouk

References

External links
Official Website

Electronic dance music
American music awards
Awards established in 2016
Annual television shows